The 2004 NCAA Division III women's basketball tournament was the 23rd annual tournament hosted by the NCAA to determine the national champion of Division III women's collegiate basketball in the United States.

Wilmington defeated Bowdoin in the championship game, 59–53, to claim the Quakers' first Division III national title.

The championship rounds were hosted by Virginia Wesleyan College in Norfolk, Virginia.

Bracket

Final Four

All-tournament team
 Tara Rausch, Wilmington 
 Amy Kincer, Wilmington 
 Erika Smith, Rochester 
 Kelly Wescott, Rochester 
 Amanda Nechuta, Wisconsin–Stevens Point
 Lora Trinkle, Bowdoin

See also
 2004 NCAA Division I women's basketball tournament
 2004 NCAA Division II women's basketball tournament
 2004 NAIA Division I women's basketball tournament
 2004 NAIA Division II women's basketball tournament
 2004 NCAA Division III men's basketball tournament

References

 
NCAA Division III women's basketball tournament
2004 in sports in Virginia
Wilmington Quakers
Bowdoin Polar Bears